Yogi Adityanath ministry may refer to:

Uttar Pradesh Council of Ministers 

 First Yogi Adityanath ministry, the 17th government of Uttar Pradesh headed by Yogi Adityanath from 2017 to 2022
 Second Yogi Adityanath ministry, the 18th government of Uttar Pradesh headed by Yogi Adityanath from 2022 onwards